Dmitri Vladimirovich Vrubel (14 July 1960 – 14 August 2022) was a Russian painter. He was best known for his East Side Gallery-painting My God, Help Me to Survive This Deadly Love, depicting the kissing communist leaders Leonid Brezhnev and Erich Honecker.

Vrubel was born in Moscow, Soviet Union. His surname is a russification of the common Polish surname Wróbel.

Early life
He was the only child of two engineers. He started painting at 15 and studied at the graphic art department of the Moscow State V.I. Lenin Pedagogical Institute.

Work
Vrubel's most famous work is the graffiti piece, painted on the Berlin Wall entitled My God, Help Me to Survive This Deadly Love which depicts the kissing communist leaders Leonid Brezhnev and Erich Honecker.

It was inspired by a photograph captured by photographer Regis Bossu depicting a socialist fraternal kiss between the leaders Leonid Brezhnev and Erich Honecker in 1979, during a celebration of the 30 years of the GDR.

In 2009, the painting was removed by the authorities as part of a cleaning effort in order to have it repainted by Vrubel.

Other works
In 2001, he and his wife, Viktoria Timofeyeva, created a large format calendar containing portraits of Russian President Vladimir Putin called "The 12 moods of Putin". Each page of the calendar portrayed a different image of Putin and was an unexpected hit with the Moscow population.

Death
Vrubel died in Berlin from complications of COVID-19 on 14 August 2022, at the age of 62.

References

External links 

1960 births
2022 deaths
Artists from Moscow
20th-century Russian painters
Russian male painters
21st-century Russian painters
Kandinsky Prize
Russian people of Polish descent
20th-century Russian male artists
21st-century Russian male artists
Moscow State Pedagogical University alumni
Deaths from the COVID-19 pandemic in Germany